Bottom is a surname. Notable people with the surname include:

Anthony Bottom (born 1951), former member of both the Black Panther Party (BPP) and the Black Liberation Army (BLA)
Arthur Bottom (1930–2012), English footballer
Bob Bottom, OAM, retired investigative journalist and author
Daniel Bottom (1864–1937), English cricketer
Dorothy Rouse Bottom (1986–1990), America newspaperwoman
River Jude Phoenix (né Bottom, 1970–1993), American actor, musician, and activist
Joaquin Rafael Phoenix (né Bottom, born 1974), American actor, producer, and activist
Joe Bottom (born 1955), American former competition swimmer, Olympic silver medalist, and former world record-holder
Mike Bottom (born c. 1966), head coach of the Michigan Wolverines swimming and diving program at the University of Michigan
Nick Bottom, character in Shakespeare's A Midsummer Night's Dream who provides comic relief throughout the play
Virgil E. Bottom (1911–2003), American born experimental physicist, contributed to the developing quartz crystal production in the US

See also

Bottom (disambiguation)
List of geographical bottoms
Bottome
Bottoms (surname)
Bottomley
Higginbottom
Hickinbottom
Longbottom (disambiguation)
Ramsbottom (surname)
Rowbottom (disambiguation)
Sidebottom
Winterbottom